= Life on Display (book) =

Book

- Author: Karen A. Rader, Victoria E. M. Cain
- Publisher: University of Chicago Press
- Publication date: 2014

Life on Display: Revolutionizing U.S. Museums of Science and Natural History in the Twentieth Century is a history of modern American science education and its relationship with museums of science. It was written by Karen A. Rader and Victoria E. M. Cain and published by the University of Chicago Press in 2014.
